Nesosmodicum gracile is a species of beetle in the family Cerambycidae. It is the only species in the genus Nesosmodicum. It was described by Melzer in 1923.

References

Cerambycinae
Beetles described in 1923
Monotypic beetle genera